Star-Crossed is an American science fiction romantic teen drama television series created by Meredith Averill. The series premiered on The CW on February 17, 2014, and concluded on May 12, 2014, with a total of 13 episodes.

On May 8, 2014, The CW cancelled Star-Crossed after one season due to low ratings.

Synopsis
Set in the near-future in 2024, the series follows a romance between a human girl named Emery and an alien boy named Roman when he and six others of his kind are integrated into a suburban high school. It is filmed and takes place in Louisiana in the fictional town of Edendale.

Cast and characters

Main
 Aimee Teegarden as Emery Whitehill:
 Emery is a 16-year-old human girl who lives in Edendale, Louisiana and the female protagonist of Star Crossed. She was 6 years old when the Atrians arrived, and on that day, she helped a young Atrian boy (later found out to have been Roman) survive. Emery spent 4 years in the hospital due to an immune deficiency and just recently began high school at the beginning of the show. Emery's first day of high school is also the day the integration program is set into action. She believes strongly in integration and meets Roman during that week. There is an immediate attraction between the two of them as the show's main love story begins to form. Emery is best friends with Julia, but is also close with Lukas, Taylor, Sophia, and, later on in the show, Eric. Her other love interest in the show is Grayson Montrose, a human boy who is seen to have cared about Emery since the beginning of the show. Her main enemy is Teri, Roman's ex girlfriend who constantly shows dislike for humans, especially Emery.
 Matt Lanter as Roman:
Roman is a 16-year-old Atrian boy who now lives on Earth in a militarized sector with the remaining members of his race. When Roman was a little boy and had to flee from the chaos of Arrival Day, he took refuge in Emery's parents' tool house upon which Emery found him and cared for him until he was found. Roman defends humans and does not despise them, he feels that while they're very unwelcoming, but knows that just like Emery, there are good people in the world. He is the son of Nox, leader of the Atrians, and is thus a natural born leader. His father dies in the Pilot after being shot by Emery's father Ray Whitehill. Roman's father's death took a huge toll on him as he now feels it is his job to keep his race alive and protect his mother and his sister, Sophia. Roman notices Emery on the first day of school and immediately recognizes her. Throughout the show, Roman is seen as having to choose between his love for Emery or keeping her safe, being that her father killed his people's leader. He feels the pressure of having to choose between his people or Emery. Roman is best friends with Drake, and he was once friends with Teri, despite their romantic past, until she betrays him and he decides that they cannot be friends. He is also close with Julia, Lukas, and friends with Taylor. His main enemy on the show is Grayson, the human boy who is also in love with Emery, and whose parents are leaders of the Red Hawks, and another concern throughout the show are the Trags a group of rebel Atrians. His uncle that takes over as leader used to be a Trag.
 Grey Damon as Grayson Montrose:
Grayson is a 16-year-old human boy who lives in Edendale, Louisiana. He is an average teenage boy (hangs out with his friends, he's on the school swim team, etc.) except for the fact that his parents are the leaders of a terrorist group against the Atrians inhabiting Earth known as the Red Hawks. Grayson is always shown to be kind and welcoming despite growing up with parents like his, but he is also seen as resolute and stubborn, using any means necessary to get what he wants. Grayson's main love interest in this show is Emery, whom he's liked a lot since the beginning of the show. When Emery learned about Grayson's parents, she was infuriated, however, she eventually forgave them and the two had a very brief romantic relationship. Grayson is best friends with Eric but is also friends with Taylor, Lukas, and Julia. His main enemy in the show is Roman, who is also in love with Emery.
 Malese Jow as Julia Yeung:
Julia is a 16-year-old human girl who lives in Edendale, Louisiana. Julia was diagnosed with Leukemia at the beginning of the show and since none of the treatments were working she was told she must go home, however Roman saves her by combining his blood with cyper as a favor to Emery. She is a very bubbly, lively young girl who is fascinated with 'all things Atrian. Julia's main love interest later in the show is Eric, an ex Red Hawk who comes to appreciate having the Atrians around. Her best friend is Emery, but she becomes very close friends with Roman after he saves her life. She is also close friends with Lukas, Taylor, Sophia, and Grayson.
 Titus Makin Jr. as Lukas Parnell:
Lukas is a 16-year-old boy who lives in Edendale, Louisiana. He is a very intelligent and kind person who excels in technological advances. Lukas has always fought for the Atrians' rights and believes in tolerance, however he starts to get a bit iffy about the Atrians' motives after he is poisoned by black cyper, a poisonous form of the Atrian herb, which was created by the Trags (Atrian terrorists against the humans) to extinguish the human race. Lukas had a crush on Sophia, but they're just friends throughout the series. He is best friends with Emery and close with Julia, Roman, Grayson, Taylor, and Eric.
 Natalie Hall as Taylor Beecham:
Taylor is a 16-year-old girl living in Edendale, Louisiana. She is very much the 'popular socialite' of this show. She forms an intense relationship with Drake, despite the fact that Sophia is interested in her, and ends up pregnant later on in the show. She is close friends with Emery, Lukas, Julia, Grayson, and Roman.
 Chelsea Gilligan as Teri:
Teri is a 16-year-old Atrian who now lives on Earth in a militarized sector with the remaining members of her race. She is very much a rebellious Atrian who despises the humans' intolerance and later becomes a Trag. Teri once had a very serious relationship with Roman until he realized that 'with (you) it's all about mind games' and ended their relationship. Her main enemy in the show is a Emery, due to the fact that Teri distrusts her as a human, and because Emery is in love with Roman. She is friends with Drake and was friends with Roman. In the beginning of the show she constantly was fighting humans that got in her way. Her mother is the leader of the Trags.
 Greg Finley as Drake:
Drake is a 16-year-old Atrian boy who now lives on Earth in a militarized sector with the remaining members of his race. Drake is a very strong, tall Atrian and he is definitely not the passive type. He forms an intense relationship with Taylor, thus resulting in her pregnancy. Drake is best friends with Roman, but also becomes friends with Emery, Julia, and Lukas. He was a Trag but realized he couldn't kill people. His mother was imprisoned in the crate which is the jail for the Sector but later released. His mother is forced to build a doomsday device for the Trags.
 Brina Palencia as Sophia:
 Roman's younger Atrian sister who is always curious about humans. After her father's death, she became frustrated with Roman as he was being overprotective of her. She tried to form a relationship with Taylor, but is rejected by her. Lukas also shows affection for her, but she is in love with Taylor. Sophia is close friends with Emery, Drake, Julia, and Lukas. She also loves to swim and later tries to join the school swim team.

Recurring and guest

 Jonathan Billions as Gloria's Son
 Dora Madison Burge as Zoe
 Jesse Luken as Eric
 Tahmoh Penikett as SEU Officer Jack Beaumont
 Jay Huguley as Ray Whitehill
 Andrea Frankle as Michelle Whitehill
 Susan Walters as Maia
 Jason Douglas as Nox
 Deena Dill as Margaret Montrose
 Tom Hillmann as Mr. Montrose
 Victoria Platt as Gloria Garcia
 Merle Dandridge as Vega
 Louise Lombard as Saroya
 Johnathon Schaech as Castor
 Stephanie Jacobsen as Eva Benton
 Alec Rayme as Sketchy Atrian

Episodes
All the episode titles after the pilot are taken from William Shakespeare's Romeo and Juliet.

Development and production
The project was originally titled Oxygen while in development at Isla Producciones (in collaboration with Olé). It was then adapted for the American market by Powwow before being acquired by The CW. Star-Crossed premiered on The CW on Monday, February 17, 2014, at 8:00 pm Eastern/7:00 pm Central. The series was picked up for a thirteen-episode season.

The language of the Atrian aliens, called Sondiv, was created for the program by language creator David J. Peterson.

Casting
In 2013, it was announced that Natalie Hall and Aimee Teegarden landed roles. On February 25, 2013, Grey Damon was cast as Grayson. In February, it was announced that Malese Jow would be joining, playing Julia, a girl who has an illness which may be cured by aliens. On March 5, 2013, Matt Lanter was cast as a co-star opposite Aimee Teegarden.
It was announced Tahmoh Penikett will appear as SEU Officer Jack Beaumont Deena Dill was cast as Margaret Montrose along with Johnathon Schaech, who was cast as Castor.

Reception

Ratings

Critical response
David Hinckley of the New York Daily News gave the series 4 out of 5 stars, saying "add forbidden love, which can never escape the shadow of potential doom, and Star-Crossed could become both provocative and entertaining." Diana Werts of Newsday gave the series 3 out of 4 stars, saying "Plenty of potential, if Star-Crossed stops talking down to us". Carrie Raisler of The A.V. Club gave the series a positive review. Jeanne Jakle of the San Antonio Express-News gave a positive review, particularly of Aimee Teegarden's performance, saying "Just as she was so heartbreakingly natural as young Julie Taylor, she also comes across refreshingly unpretentious in Star-Crossed — which, actually, may be the best reason of all to watch the CW drama."

Gail Pennington of the St. Louis Post-Dispatch gave the series 2 of 4 stars signaling mixed reviews, saying "Star-Crossed doesn't aim as high as those, Lanter does get a few witty lines ("One of my hearts stopped beating for a few minutes. Luckily I had a backup)" but the tone is mostly dreary and the plot with few exceptions goes precisely where you expect. Only if the romance proves genuinely heart-stopping to young fans (maybe, the same ones who have embraced Reign) will this one be a hit." Robert Lloyd of the Los Angeles Times gave the series a mixed review, saying "It's the usual dance of insiders and outsiders, mean kids and weirdos, of Sharks and Jets, Montagues and Capulets biting their thumbs at one another in the school corridor while one special guy and girl fall in love. There are the good ones and the bad ones, and the bad good ones, and the good bad ones. Adults, as always in these things, are no help at all."

David Wiegand of the San Francisco Chronicle gave it a negative review, writing: "The title is Star-Crossed because it's about an alien boy who falls in love with a human girl, a repurposed 'Romeo and Juliet', without the poetry. Or drama. Or credibility." Robert Bianco, of USA Today, saying "As vapid as it is unoriginal, Star-Crossed is sadly typical of a network that continually underestimates its audience. Teenagers may not be smarter than they were when the WB was at its peak, but it's unlikely they're dumber. So why does CW treat them as if they are?" Matt Roush of TV Guide gave a negative review, saying "Star-Crossed lacks humor, suspense or even heat."

Awards and accolades

Broadcast
The series aired in Australia, eight and a half hours behind the East Coast of the United States on Fox8 from Tuesday, February 18, 2014, at 8:30 p.m. In the United Kingdom, the show aired on Sky 1 on Friday, April 4, 2014 at 8 p.m.

References

External links
 

2010s American high school television series
2010s American romance television series
2010s American science fiction television series
2010s American teen drama television series
2010s romantic drama television series
2014 American television series debuts
2014 American television series endings
Alien invasions in television
American romantic drama television series
The CW original programming
English-language television shows
Television series about teenagers
Television series by CBS Studios
Television series by Warner Bros. Television Studios
Television series set in the 2020s
Television shows filmed in Louisiana
Television shows set in Louisiana
Works based on Romeo and Juliet